Tuxedo Park may refer to:

Tuxedo Park, Missouri, a community now merged with Webster Groves, Missouri
Tuxedo Park, New York, listed on the National Register of Historic Places in Orange County, New York
Tuxedo Park (Atlanta), listed on the National Register of Historic Places in Fulton County, Georgia
Tuxedo Park, Calgary, Alberta, Canada
A trim level of the Jeep CJ
Tuxedo Park a book by Jennet Conant about Alfred Lee Loomis

See also
Tuxedo (disambiguation)
Tuxedo Park School